White is a surname either of English or of Scottish and Irish origin, the latter being an anglicisation of the Scottish Gaelic MacGillebhàin, "Son of the fair gillie" and the Irish "Mac Faoitigh" or "de Faoite". It is the seventeenth most common surname in England. In the 1990 United States Census, "White" ranked fourteenth among all reported surnames in frequency, accounting for 0.28% of the population. By 2000, White had fallen to position 20 in the United States and 22nd position by 2014

Notable people with the surname include:
White (Hampshire cricketer) (active 1789–1797, full name unknown), English cricketer
White (Surrey cricketer) (active 1850, full name unknown), English cricketer

A
Aaron White (basketball) (born 1992), American basketball player
Adam White (disambiguation), multiple people
Addison White (1824–1909), American politician
Adlyn White (1929–2017), Jamaican educator and Christian minister 
Al White (disambiguation), multiple people
Alan White (disambiguation), multiple people
Albert White (musician) (born 1942), American blues guitarist, singer and songwriter
Alex White (disambiguation), multiple people
Alexander White (disambiguation), multiple people
Alfred Holmes White (1873–1953), American chemical engineering professor
Alfred Tredway White, American housing reformer
Alice White (1904–1983), American actress
Allie White (1915–1996), American football player
Andrew Dickson White, US diplomat and co-founder of Cornell University
Andrew White (disambiguation), multiple people
Andy White (disambiguation), multiple people
Anthony White (disambiguation), multiple people
Azellia White (1913–2019), American aviator

B
Barclay White (1821–1906), Superintendent of Indian Affairs under President Grant
Barry White (1944–2003), American soul and disco singer
Bartow White (1776–1862), US Congressman from New York
Benjamin White (disambiguation), multiple people
Betty White (1922–2021), American actress
Beverly White (1928-2021), American activist and politician
Bill White (disambiguation), multiple people
Blaire White (born 1993), American YouTuber and political commentator
Bodi White, Louisiana politician
Bree White (born 1981), Australian rules footballer
Brendan White (born 1992), Australian association football player
Brett White (executive), chief executive officer of the investment firm CBRE Group
Brian White (disambiguation), multiple people
Brooke White (born 1983), American singer-songwriter and American Idol contestant
Bryan D. White (1936–2017), general secretary and CEO of Moose International in Great Britain
Buck White (born 1930), member of the American country music vocal group The Whites
Bukka White (Booker T. Washington White) (1909–1977), American Delta blues guitarist and singer
Byron White (1917-2002), Associate Justice of the Supreme Court of the United States

C
Cameron White, Australian cricketer
Charlie White (figure skater), American Olympic silver, bronze, and gold medalist ice dancer
Charles White (writer) (1845–1922), Australian journalist and author
Cr1TiKaL (Charles White Jr., born 1994), American YouTuber, Twitch streamer, podcaster, actor, musician, and businessman
Charline White, Michigan politician
Charlotte Price White, (1873 - 1932), Welsh suffragist and politician 
Charmaine White Face, American human rights activist
Cheryl White (born 1955), member of the American country music vocal group The Whites
Chilton A. White (1826–1900), US Representative from Ohio
Christian Streit White (1839–1917), West Virginia politician
Christopher White (disambiguation), multiple people
Clarence White (1944–1973), American bluegrass and country guitarist (Kentucky Colonels, The Byrds)
Claude Porter White (1907-1975), American author and composer
Coby White (born 2000), American basketball player
Cody White (disambiguation), multiple people
Colin White (disambiguation), multiple people
Colton White (born 1997), Canadian ice hockey player
Compton I. White, Jr., US Representative from Idaho
Compton I. White, US Representative from Idaho
Curtis White (author), American essayist

D
Dan White (disambiguation), multiple people
Dana White (born 1969), American MMA promoter and president of UFC
Danny White (born 1952), American football player
Darren White (disambiguation), multiple people
David White (disambiguation), multiple people
Davin White (born 1981), American basketball player
Deacon White, aka James "Deacon" White, (1847–1939), baseball star
DeMario White Jr. (born 1991), birth name of Moneybagg Yo, American rapper
Denny White, Ohio politician
Des White, New Zealand rugby league footballer
Desmond White (footballer) (1911–1985), Scottish footballer
Devin White (born 1998), American football player
Devon White (baseball), Jamaican American baseball player
Diamond White, American singer and actress
Doc White, American baseball player
Donny White, American college sports coach and administrator
Doug White (disambiguation), multiple people
Douglas R. White (born 1942), American anthropologist
Duncan White (1918–1998), Sri Lankan Burgher athlete, first to win an Olympic medal for Sri Lanka

E
E. B. White (1899–1985), American children's book author
Ed White (astronaut) (1930–1967), American astronaut
Eden White (born 1970), American singer-songwriter
Edith White (1855–1946), American painter 
Edith Grace White (1890–1975), American zoologist
Edmund White (born 1940), American literary critic
Edward White (disambiguation) (or Ed White), multiple people
Eg White (born 1966 as Francis White), British musician, songwriter and producer
Eli White (born 1994), American baseball player
Elizabeth Coleman White (1871–1954), pioneering American blueberry breeder and vendor
Ellen White (footballer) (born 1989), English footballer
Ellen G. White (1827–1915), American Christian pioneer
Erica White (born 1986), American basketball player
Erica White (artist) (1904–1991), British sculptor
Erik White, American music director
Erik White (Canadian football), American football player of Canadian football
Erin White, Canadian softball first baseman
Estelle White (1925-2011) British hymn composer
Ethel Lina White (1876–1944), British crime writer
Evan White (baseball) (born 1996), American baseball player

F
Faye White (born 1978), English football player
Felix Harold White (1884–1945), English composer, music teacher and pianist
Florence Mildred White (1874–1957), English policewoman
Francis White (disambiguation), multiple people
Frank White (disambiguation), multiple people
Franklin White (dancer), British ballet dancer
Fred White (musician) (1955–2023), American musician, member of Earth, Wind & Fire
Frederick D. White, Canadian politician
Freeman White, American football player
Fuzz White, American Major League Baseball right fielder

G
Gary White (disambiguation), multiple people
Genevieve Beatrice White (1913–2009), also known as Genevieve Pezet, American-born French artist
George White (British Army officer), British general
George White (Ohio politician), governor of Ohio
George Henry White, North Carolina politician
Gilbert F. White (1911–2006), American geographer
Gilbert White (1720–1793), English naturalist
Gillian White (disambiguation), multiple people

H
Harry Dexter White, American economist, US representative to the Bretton Woods Conference
Henry White (disambiguation), multiple people
Horace White (disambiguation), multiple people
Howard White (footballer) (born 1954), English footballer
Hugh L. White, American politician from Mississippi
Hugo White (1939–2014), British royal navy admiral

I
Ian White (darts player) (born 1970), English darts player
Ian White (ice hockey) (born 1984), Canadian professional ice hockey defence man
Ilka White, Australian textile artist
Isobel Mary White (1912–1997), Australian anthropologist
Israel Charles White (1848–1927), American geologist

J
Jack White (disambiguation), multiple people
Jake White (born 1963), South African rugby union coach
Jaleel White (born 1976), American actor
James White (disambiguation), multiple people
Jamie White, American radio host and actress
Jan White (born 1948), American football player
Javin White (born 1997), American football player
Jay White (born 1992), New Zealand professional wrestler
Jeff White (Australian footballer)
Jeordie White aka Twiggy Ramirez (born 1971), American bassist and guitarist
Jimmy White, English professional snooker player
Jock White, Scottish footballer
Joe White (disambiguation), multiple people
John White (disambiguation), multiple people
Jordan White (musician) (born 1982), American rock musician and singer-songwriter
Jose White (American football) (born 1973), American football player
Joseph Blanco White (1775–1841), Spanish theologian
Julian White (born 1973), English rugby union footballer

K
Karen Malina White (born 1965), American actress
Karyn White (born 1965), American R&B singer during the late 1980s and early 1990s
Katie White (born 1983), British singer in The Ting Tings
Keion White (born 1999), American football player
Keith White (yachtsman), British physically disabled yachtsman, attempted world solo circumnavigation in 2015
Kelli White, American sprinter
Kerwin White, former ring name of American wrestler Chavo Guerrero, Jr.
Kevin White (disambiguation), multiple people
Kyzir White (born 1996), American football player

L
Lari White (1965–2018), American country music singer
Laura White (actress) (born 1996), British actress
Laura Rosamond White (1844-1922), American author
Lavelle White (born 1929), American Texas blues and soul blues singer and songwriter
Lawrence White (disambiguation), multiple people
Lee White (actor) (1888–1949), American actor of the stage, screen and radio
Lee White (American football) (born 1946), American football player
Lee C. White (1923–2013), advisor to President Kennedy and President Johnson
Leo White (1882–1948), English-American film and stage actor who appeared in many Charlie Chaplin films
Leo White (judoka) (born 1957), member of the US Olympic judo team
Leon White (1955–2018), American professional wrestler better known as Big Van Vader or Vader
Leslie White (1900–1975), American anthropologist
Lily White (photographer) (1866–1944), American photographer
Liz White (actress) (born 1979), British actress
Loren H. White (1863–1923), New York state senator
Lulu Belle Madison White (1900–1957), American teacher and civil rights activist
Lynn White (born 1953), American soul blues singer

M
Malcolm White (cricketer) (1924–2009), English cricketer
Malinda Brumfield White (born 1967), member of the Louisiana House of Representatives
Margaret Bourke-White, American photographer and documentary photographer
Margaret Matilda White (1868–1910), New Zealand photographer
Mark White (disambiguation), multiple people
Marquez White (born 1994), American football player
Mary White (disambiguation), multiple people
Mary Louisa White (1866-1935) British composer, educator and pianist
Maureen White, Canadian theatre director, actor, and playwright
Maurice White (1941–2016), American musician, founder and leader of the band Earth, Wind & Fire
Meg White (born 1974), American musician, drummer in The White Stripes
Michael White (disambiguation), multiple people, includes Mike White
Minor White, American photographer
Mitchell White (disambiguation), multiple people
Molly White (disambiguation), multiple people
Morgan White (gymnast) (born 1983), American gymnast
Morgan White (radio DJ) (1924–2010), American radio disc jockey and actor

N
Nancy White (disambiguation), multiple people
Nathaniel White (born 1960), American serial killer
Nettie L. White (c. 1850 – 1921), American suffragist and stenographer
Nicholas White (disambiguation), multiple people
Noel White (rugby league), Australian rugby league footballer

O
Oliver White (born 1995), British YouTube personality
Onna White (1922–2005), Canadian choreographer and dancer

P
Pat White (American football) (born 1986), American football quarterback
Patrick White (1912–1990), Australian author
Paul Dudley White (1886–1973), American cardiologist
Percy White, Australian rugby league footballer
Peregrine White (1620–1704), first child born to the Pilgrims in New England
Peter White (disambiguation), multiple people
Portia White (1911–1968), Canadian operatic contralto

R
Rachaad White (born 1999), American football player
Rachel White (disambiguation), multiple people 
Randy White (disambiguation), multiple people
Reggie White (1961–2004), American football player
Reggie White (defensive lineman, born 1970), American football player
Reggie White (running back) (born 1979), American football player
Rick White (politician) (born 1953), American politician from Washington
Robert White (disambiguation), multiple people
Roddy White (born 1981), American football player
Roderick White (1814–1856), New York politician
Romello White (born 1998), American basketball player for Hapoel Eilat of the Israeli Basketball Premier League
Rodney White (born 1980), American basketball player
Ron White (born 1956), American comedian
Rosie White (born 1993), New Zealand soccer player
Royce White (born 1991), American basketball player
Ryan White (1971–1990), American HIV/AIDS poster child, namesake of the Ryan White Care Act
Resolved White (17th century), passenger on the Pilgrim ship Mayflower

S
Sallie Joy White (1847–1909), American journalist 
Sammy White (disambiguation), multiple people
Sandra White (born 1951), Scottish politician
Sharon White, lead singer of American country music group The Whites
Shaun White (born 1986), American snowboarder and skateboarder
Sheila White (abolitionist) (born 1988), American abolitionist and human trafficking victim
Sheila White (actress) (1948–2018), British film, television and stage actress
Simon White (born 1951), British astrophysicist
Slappy White (1924–1995), American comedian and actor
Snowy White (Terence Charles 'Snowy' White) (born 1948), English guitarist
Spencer White (born 1994), Australian rules footballer
Stanford White (1853–1906), American architect, member of the firm McKim, Mead, and White
Stephen White (disambiguation), multiple people
Steve White (disambiguation), multiple people
Steven White (disambiguation), multiple people
Stewart White (journalist) (born 1947), British television newsreader and presenter
Stewart Edward White (1873–1946), American novelist and outdoorsman

T
T. H. White (1906–1964), English author, known for The Once and Future King
Ted White (author) (born 1938), American science fiction writer and music critic
Terri White (born 1948), American singer and actress
The Whites, American country music vocal group
Theodore H. White (1915–1986), American journalist
Thomas White (disambiguation) (or Tom White)
Timothy White (disambiguation) (or Tim White)
Todd White (disambiguation), multiple people
Tony White (disambiguation), multiple people
Tony Joe White (1943–2018), American singer-songwriter
Tre'Davious White (born 1995), American football player
Tyler White (born 1990), American baseball player

V
Vanessa White (born 1989), British singer and songwriter
Vanna White (born 1957), American television personality
Verdine White (born 1951), American musician, younger brother of Maurice White, bass guitarist in Earth, Wind & Fire
Vince White (born 1960), English guitarist who replaced Joe Strummer in The Clash
Violetta Susan White (1875–1949), American mycologist

W
Walter Francis White (1893–1955), American civil rights activist
Warren White (disambiguation), multiple people
Wendy White (tennis), American professional tennis player
Wendy Tan White (born 1970), British technology company executive
Sir Willard White (born 1946), Jamaican-born British operatic bass-baritone
William White (disambiguation), multiple people
Willie White (disambiguation), multiple people

Z
Zamir White (born 1999), American football player

Fictional characters
Brad White, a character in 2001 psychological horror movie Frailty
Cammy White, from the Street Fighter video game series
Carrie White, title character from the Stephen King novel and movie Carrie
Frank White, lead character in the 1990 film King of New York
Perry White, supporting character in the Superman comics
Snow White, protagonist of German fairy tales
Mrs. White, one of six original Cluedo characters
 Redd White, from the video game Phoenix Wright: Ace Attorney
Walter White, protagonist of the American television series Breaking Bad
Trooper White, a minor character in the video game TimeSplitters 2

References

English-language surnames
Surnames of English origin
Scottish surnames
Surnames of Scottish origin
Surnames of Irish origin
Anglicised Scottish Gaelic-language surnames
Anglicised Irish-language surnames

fr:White
ru:Уайт